Cargaison blanche or Le Chemin de Rio (English literal translation: White Cargo or The Road To Rio) is a 1937 French crime film directed by Robert Siodmak and starring Käthe von Nagy, Jules Berry and Suzy Prim. in which two journalists go on the trail of gangsters who are kidnapping women to sell in South America. The film was made by Nero Film, with sets designed by the art director Lucien Aguettand.

It was released in the United States in 1950 by Distinguished Films Inc. as French White Cargo, and reissued there in 1952 by Joseph Brenner as Woman Racket.  Some sources claim it may also have been known in the USA as Traffic in Souls.

Plot summary

Main cast

References

Bibliography 
 Greco, Joseph. The File on Robert Siodmak in Hollywood, 1941-1951. Universal-Publishers, 1999.

External links 
 
 
 

1937 films
French crime drama films
1937 crime drama films
1930s French-language films
Films directed by Robert Siodmak
Films about journalists
Films about prostitution in Brazil
French black-and-white films
Films scored by Paul Dessau
Films produced by Seymour Nebenzal
1930s French films
Films set in Barcelona